The Lycée Français Théodore Monod (LFTM) is a French international school in Nouakchott, Mauritania. It serves primary through lycée (senior high school).

References

External links
 Lycée Français Théodore Monod 

French international schools in Africa
International schools in Mauritania
Nouakchott